Solopos is an Indonesian daily newspaper published in the city of Surakarta, Central Java. First published in September 1997, it is published by PT. Aksara Solopos (which is mostly owned by the business daily Bisnis Indonesia). The daily is known as the major newspaper in the city and surrounding areas.

External links
 Official website

Newspapers published in Indonesia
Newspapers established in 1997
1997 establishments in Indonesia